The 2020–21 Inverness Caledonian Thistle season is the club's 27th season in existence, and their fourth consecutive season in the Championship, the second-tier of Scottish football.

Events

Pre-Season 

 5 June 2020: Inverness CT announce a new kit deal with German manufactures, Puma, on a multi-year partnership, and a sponsorship deal with Intelligent Land Investments Group. Profits from the pink-themed away kit will go towards local charity, Highland Hospice.
 15 June 2020: Manager John Robertson signs a new deal keeping him in charge until the 2022–23 season.
 5 July 2020: Season ticket sales surpass half of the previous season's sales within a week of launching.
 9 July 2020: Former player Shane Sutherland returns to Inverness, 8 years after he initially left for Elgin City, having signed a Pre Contract Agreement in the January transfer window.
 6 August 2020: Celtic player Robbie Deas signs a 3-year-deal at the Caledonian Stadium.
 10 August 2020: Inverness are drawn into Group A for the League Cup, alongside Hearts, Raith, Cowdenbeath and East Fife.
 13 August 2020: Scott Allardice signs a 1-year-deal from Irish club, Waterford.
 17 August 2020: Scottish Cup winning defender Danny Devine returns to Inverness, signing a 2-year-deal from Dunfermline Athletic.

September 2020 

 11 September 2020: Ryan Fyffe and Harry Nicolson re-sign for Inverness after being initially released at the end of the previous season as a cost cutting measure. 
 Club Historian, Ian Broadfoot's book 'Milestones and Memories' detailing the club's twenty-five year history, goes to print.
 27 September 2020: Inverness take on Elgin City in a friendly at Borough Briggs, with the Invernesians recording a 7–3 win.
 30 September 2020: Inverness beat Nairn County 7–0 at Station Park, in another friendly.

October 2020 

 3 October 2020: Two friendlies: One half of the Inverness squad played Invernesian rivals, Clachnacuddin, at Grant Street Park, claiming a 2–0 win; while the other half met Elgin City at the Caledonian Stadium, recording a 1–1 draw.
 4 October 2020: Kai Kennedy signs a loan deal with Inverness from Rangers.
 5 October 2020: Within days of agreeing a transfer to Greenock Morton, Wallace Duffy signs for Inverness from St Johnstone, after the Morton move is nullified. 
 7 October 2020: Inverness kick-off the season with a 1–0 defeat to Hearts in the League Cup.
 13 October 2020: Inverness failed to beat League Two side, Cowdenbeath, with the Highlanders 'winning' 4–2 on penalties after a 0–0 draw.
 18 October 2020: Inverness start the league campaign losing 3–1 to Dunfermline despite Nikolay Todorov scoring within the first minute of the game.
 24 October 2020: Inverness draw 1–1 at home against Ayr United. The match drew much media attention due to the ball-tracking AI camera confusing a linesman's bald head for the ball.
 31 October 2020: Inverness defeat Arbroath 3–1.

November 2020 

 6 November 2020: The book, 'Milestones and Memories' is launched.
 7 November 2020: Hearts defeat Inverness 2–1 at Tynecastle.
 11 November 2020: A 3–2 lead was surrendered against Raith Rovers in the final-minute of a League Cup group game, with the home team taking the bonus point after a 3–2 'win' on penalties, in Kirkcaldy.
 13 November 2020:  The Scottish Government announce that football clubs in Level 1 lockdown areas can have limited attendances. Inverness announce they can safely let 300 fans return for the club's next home game against Raith Rovers - via a ballot system of season ticket holders. The plan will be repeated for the following home game, against Dundee in December.
 14 November 2020: Inverness edge a 1–0 win over East Fife in the League Cup.
 21 November 2020: Inverness clinch a 2–0 win against Raith Rovers in front of a restricted group of home fans.
 24 November 2020: Inverness respond to allegations in the Daily Record, following a headline alleging they had breached COVID Rules, with the club stating that everything was done in accordance with government guidelines.

December 2020 

 4 December 2020: Inverness defeat Queen of the South, 3–0.
 9 December 2020: An Inverness offer to host the 2020 Scottish Cup Final between Celtic and Hearts on 20 December - to allow some Highland-based spectators to attend - is rejected by the SFA.
 12 December 2020: Inverness and Dundee contest a 2–2 draw, in front of a ballot-selected 300 home fans.
 18 December 2020: Club Historian, Ian Broadfoot is awarded Life Membership by the Club.
 19 December 2020: The club succumbs to a 2–1 defeat at the hands of part-time side, Alloa Athletic.
 26 December 2020: The Scottish Government increases COVID restrictions across the country to Level 4. Inverness and other Highland and Moray clubs can now no longer have limited-capacity attendances.
 28 December 2020: In a revised format to the Scottish Cup, Inverness are drawn away to Highland League side, Buckie Thistle.
 30 December 2020: In their last game of 2020, Inverness draw 1–1 with Dunfermline.

January 2021 

 2 January 2021: Recent Life Membership recipient and Club Historian, Ian Broadfoot, dies aged 73 after falling ill on Boxing Day.
 5 January 2021: With the travel restrictions between Inverness and Glasgow, Kai Kennedy cuts-short his loan, citing homesickness. However, he later signs for Championship rivals, Raith Rovers.
 10 January 2021: The Highland Derby becomes a possibility, as Ross County is drawn against Inverness or Buckie Thistle in the Scottish Cup Third round.
 11 January 2021: All competitions below the Scottish Championship, including the Scottish Cup, are postponed, with a planned resumption in late-March.
 31 January 2021: Of six scheduled fixtures for Inverness in January, only one is played, a 2–2 away draw to Greenock Morton.

February 2021 

 6/7 February 2021: Inverness are approached by Federation of Hearts Supporters General Secretary, Stevie Kilgour, proposing a 'virtual ticket' scheme as a thank-you for Inverness donating to Hearts in 2013, when the Edinburgh club were experiencing severe financial difficulties. It is reported that 5,000 tickets are sold in the first 24 hours. 
 8 February 2021: Anthony McDonald returns to Inverness after a short spell with Cordoba in Spain's Segunda Division B.
 9 February 2021: 7,820 virtual tickets are sold, "breaking" the previous attendance record of 7,753 against Rangers in January 2008.
 19 February 2021: Due to the demand of virtual tickets, the club launches a limited supply of commemorative match programmes.
 22 February 2021: Manager John Robertson steps down for the remainder of the season on compassionate leave due to a family bereavement. Neil McCann is appointed interim manager the following day.
 23 February 2021: Inverness draw 2–2 with Alloa.
 26 February 2021: Virtual ticket sales reach 10,000 on the day of the match against Hearts.
 The game ends with the runaway league leaders securing a 1–1 draw in Inverness, while the final "attendance" is recorded as 11,356 - exceeding the capacity of the Caledonian Stadium.

March 2021 

 2 March 2021: Inverness lose 2–1 to Dundee at Dens Park, leaving the club in 7th place.
4 March 2021: James Keatings signs a pre contract agreement with Championship rivals, Raith Rovers.
 6/10 March 2021: A 1–1 draw with Alloa followed by a 1–0 loss to Greenock Morton, leaves Inverness occupying the relegation play-off spot in the table.
 12 March 2021: Inverness draw 0–0 against Raith Rovers, moving the club out of the relegation play-off spot, on goal difference.
16 March 2021: Inverness secure their second win of 2021, by beating 10-man Raith Rovers - moving the team up to 6th place and within 3 points of the promotion play-off places.
20 March 2021: Inverness return to Fife and move up to 5th in the league, with David Carson scoring a late winner against Dunfermline Athletic at East End Park.
23 March 2021: Inverness' Scottish Cup game against Buckie Thistle finishes in a 3–2 victory, with Daniel MacKay scoring in the 83rd minute to win the tie and take the club forward to a Highland Derby fixture in the following round.
26 March 2021: Defender Lewis Toshney departs the club citing homesickness.
27 March 2021: Hibernian midfielder, Scott Allan, joins on-loan until the end of the season. He debuts as a substitute in Inverness' 1–0 win against Arbroath on the same day.

April 2021 

2 April 2021: Inverness progress to the Fourth round of the Scottish Cup, eliminating Highland Derby rivals, Ross County, 3–1 in Dingwall.
6 April 2021: Inverness record their sixth consecutive win in all competitions, beating Morton 4–1, in Greenock.
10 April 2021: Inverness's winning streak comes to an end after a 1–1 draw away to Queen of the South.
13 April 2021: David Carson is named Championship Player of the Month for March 2021.
16 April 2021: Inverness's 8 game unbeaten run in all competitions comes to a close with defeat to St Mirren in the Scottish Cup.
21 April 2021: 9-man Inverness draw 1–1 with Dundee after a late equalizer by Lee Ashcroft for the visiting Dundonians. Inverness now have to win both their remaining games, and hope for other results to 'go their way', to qualify for the play-offs.
24 April 2021: Inverness fail to beat Heart of Midlothian, losing 3–0. Meanwhile, Dundee and Dunfermline secure wins against Raith Rovers and Arbroath respectively, denying a play-off spot for Inverness, who will now finish 5th.
30 April 2021: After a year of inactivity, the 2020 Challenge Cup final is cancelled, with Inverness and Raith Rovers 'sharing' the trophy.
Inverness finish the season at home with a 2–2 draw against Ayr United.

May 2021 

13 May 2021: Daniel MacKay signs for Hibernian for an undisclosed fee.
14 May 2021: John Robertson returns to the club in a 'Director of Sport' role, leaving the managerial position vacant.

Fixtures and Results

Friendlies

League 

The league was cut down to 27 Games from 36 Games in accordance with Government Guidelines on COVID-19 and Social Distancing.

Scottish Cup

League Cup

Challenge Cup 
The Scottish Challenge Cup was unanimously cancelled due to the Coronavirus Pandemic preventing fans from attending - with 34 of the 42 SPFL clubs agreeing it was not financially viable to play the tournament behind closed doors.

North of Scotland Cup 
The North of Scotland Cup was cancelled.

Team Statistics

League table

Management Statistics

First Team Player Statistics

League Goalscorers

Overall Goalscorers 

*as of match played 30 April 2021

**players in italics left the club during the season, so cannot move up the table

Transfers 

*at time of transfer/loan

References

Inverness Caledonian Thistle F.C. seasons
Inverness